Halina Pitoń (born 26 September 1972) is a Polish biathlete. She competed at the 1992, 1994 and the 1998 Winter Olympics. She is married to Polish Olympic biathlete Wojciech Kozub. She also won gold in the 15km event at the 1995 Biathlon European Championships.

References

1972 births
Living people
Biathletes at the 1992 Winter Olympics
Biathletes at the 1994 Winter Olympics
Biathletes at the 1998 Winter Olympics
Polish female biathletes
Olympic biathletes of Poland
People from Tatra County